Ea Bar may refer to several places in Vietnam, including:

Ea Bar, Đắk Lắk, a rural commune of Buôn Đôn District
, a rural commune of Sông Hinh District